Andrada  is a surname, as well as a Romanian feminine given name. Notable people with the surname include:

Alonso Andrada (1590–1672), biographer and ascetic writer
Diogo de Paiva de Andrada (1528–1575), Portuguese theologian born at Coimbra
Edgardo Andrada (born 1939), retired professional Argentine footballer who played as goalkeeper
Esteban Andrada (born 1991), Argentine international football goalkeeper
José Bonifácio de Andrada e Silva (1763–1838), Brazilian politician, diplomat and naturalist
Manuel Andrada (1890-?), Argentine polo player
Marliece Andrada (born 1972), Playboy's Playmate of the Month in March 1998
Víctor Hugo Andrada (born 1958), former Argentine - Bolivian football midfielder nicknamed "Copito"

See also
Andrada Polytechnic High School (founded 2012), high school in the Vail Unified School District

References

Romanian feminine given names